Agostino Nifo (Latinized as Augustinus Niphus; 1538 or 1545) was an Italian philosopher and commentator.

Life
He was born at Sessa Aurunca near Naples. He proceeded to Padua, where he studied philosophy. He lectured at Padua, Naples, Rome, and Pisa, and won so high a reputation that he was deputed by Leo X to defend the Catholic doctrine of immortality against the attack of Pomponazzi and the Alexandrists. In return for this he was made Count Palatine, with the right to call himself by the name Medici.

Work
In his early thought he followed Averroes, but afterwards modified his views so far as to make himself acceptable to the orthodox Catholics. In 1495 he produced an edition of the works of Averroes; with a commentary compatible with his acquired orthodoxy.

In the great controversy with the Alexandrists he opposed the theory of Pietro Pomponazzi, that the rational soul is inseparably bound up with the material part of the individual, and hence that the death of the body carries with it the death of the soul. He insisted that the individual soul, as part of absolute intellect, is indestructible, and on the death of the body is merged in the eternal unity.

Writings

His principal philosophical works are:
 (1503).
 
 (1518).
 
 (1521).
 (1523).
 (1526, written in 1504).
 (1535) reprinted by Gabriel Naudè with the title  (1645).

His numerous commentaries on Aristotle were widely read and frequently reprinted, the best-known edition being one printed at Paris in 1645 in fourteen volumes (including the Opuscula).
 

The famous phrase, to 'think with the learned, and speak with the vulgar' is attributed to Nifo.

English translations
 Leen Spruit (ed.), Agostino Nifo: De intellectu, Leiden: Brill, 2011 (Brill's Studies in Intellectual History).

See also
 Nicoletto Vernia, his teacher

References

Further reading
 E. J. Ashworth, "Agostino Nifo's Reinterpretation of Medieval Logic," Rivista critica di storia della filosofia, 31, 1976, pp. 354–374.
 Lisa  Jardine, "Dialectic or dialectical rhetoric. Agostino Nifo’s criticism of Lorenzo Valla", Rivista critica di storia della filosofia, 36, 1981, pp. 253–270.
 E. P. Mahoney, Two Aristotelians of the Italian Renaissance. Nicoletto Vernia and Agostino  Nifo, Aldershot: Ashgate 2000.

External links

  Heinrich C. Kuhn Augustinus Niphus on Why to study Aristotle at Universities: The Præfatio in libros de anima

1473 births
16th-century deaths
Academic staff of the University of Pisa